"Get Silly" is a song by Ghanaian American rapper V.I.C. from his album Beast, produced by Mr. Collipark, Soulja Boy Tell 'Em, and The Package Store. "Get Silly" was certified Gold by the RIAA on November 13, 2008, for sales of over 500,000.

Music video
The video features V.I.C. and Soulja Boy Tell 'Em "getting silly". It premiered on BET's 106 & Park on February 14, 2008, and was added to his official YouTube channel on February 26, 2008. A video by V.I.C. teaching the "Get Silly" dance appeared a few weeks later.

Remix
The official remix, featuring Soulja Boy Tell 'Em, Bun B, E-40, Unk, Polow da Don, and Jermaine Dupri, is the final track on the album Beast and is a digital download single. The extended version of the remix features additional verses by Arab, Big Kuntry King, Bubba Sparxxx, Pitbull, and Tex James. An alternative version of the extended remix features a verse by Jay Rock in place of Pitbull.

Lil Wayne released a freestyle in late November 2008 for his mixtape Dedication 3. It is titled "Get Bizzy" and features Gudda Gudda. Nicki Minaj made a freestyle in 2009 which is featured on her mixtape Beam Me Up Scotty. Tay-K released a freestyle on late 2018.

Charts

Weekly charts

Year-end charts

Certifications

References 

2008 debut singles
2008 songs
Songs written by Soulja Boy
Snap songs
Warner Records singles
Music videos directed by Dale Resteghini
Hip hop dance
Novelty and fad dances